Ulvi Yenal (10 April 1908 – 26 May 1993) was a Turkish footballer. He competed in the football tournament at the 1928 Summer Olympics. He also became the first CEO of Turkish Airlines in 1956.

References

External links
 

1908 births
1993 deaths
Turkish footballers
Turkey international footballers
Olympic footballers of Turkey
Footballers at the 1928 Summer Olympics
Footballers from Thessaloniki
Association football forwards
Association football goalkeepers
Turkish chief executives
Chief executives in the airline industry